Jiao Huancheng (born October 1949) is a Chinese politician who served as director of the National Government Offices Administration from 1997 to 2015.

He was a representative of the 15th, 16th, 17th and 18th National Congress of the Chinese Communist Party. He was a member of the 16th Central Commission for Discipline Inspection. He was an alternate member of the 17th Central Committee of the Chinese Communist Party and a member of the 19th Central Committee of the Chinese Communist Party. He was a member of the 12th National Committee of the Chinese People's Political Consultative Conference.

Biography
Jiao was born in Xiyang County, Shanxi, in October 1949. 

He was an official in Xiyang County Public Security Bureau in February 1964 and became league secretary of the county's people's commune in October of that same year. In January 1971, he became an official in the Office of the CCP Xiyang County Committee and rose to become party secretary of the county in June 1973. In November 1973, he became a secretary for Chen Yonggui, and served until February 1983.

In February 1983, he was transferred to Beijing and assigned to the National Government Offices Administration. He served as deputy director in May 1994, and three years later promoted to the director position. In July 2002, he took up the post of deputy secretary-general of the State Council which he held from 2002 to 2015, although he remained director of the National Government Offices Administration.

References

1949 births
Living people
People from Xiyang County
Central Party School of the Chinese Communist Party alumni
People's Republic of China politicians from Shanxi
Chinese Communist Party politicians from Shanxi
Alternate members of the 17th Central Committee of the Chinese Communist Party
Members of the 18th Central Committee of the Chinese Communist Party
Members of the 12th Chinese People's Political Consultative Conference